The 2nd Duke of Norfolk might refer to:
 John Mowbray, 2nd Duke of Norfolk, from the first creation
 Thomas Howard, 2nd Duke of Norfolk, from the third creation